The 1991 NOFV-Pokal Final decided the winner of the 1990–91 NOFV-Pokal, the 40th season of East Germany's premier knockout football cup competition. It was played on 2 June 1991 at the Friedrich-Ludwig-Jahn-Sportpark in Berlin. Hansa Rostock won the match 1–0 against Stahl Eisenhüttenstadt for their 1st title. This was the final East German cup final, as East and West Germany had reunified, along with their respective football associations.

Route to the final
The NOFV-Pokal began with 61 teams in a single-elimination knockout cup competition. There were a total of five rounds leading up to the final. Teams were drawn against each other, and the winner after 90 minutes would advance. If still tied, extra time, and if necessary penalties were used to determine the winner.

Note: In all results below, the score of the finalist is given first (H: home; A: away).

Match

Details

References

FC Hansa Rostock matches
Eisenhüttenstädter FC Stahl matches
Fdgb-Pokal Final
1991
June 1991 sports events in Europe
1991 in Berlin
Football competitions in Berlin
1990s in Mecklenburg-Western Pomerania